Robert Howard Grubbs ForMemRS (February 27, 1942 – December 19, 2021) was an American chemist and the Victor and Elizabeth Atkins Professor of Chemistry at the California Institute of Technology in Pasadena, California. He was a co-recipient of the 2005 Nobel Prize in Chemistry for his work on olefin metathesis. 

Grubbs was elected a member of the National Academy of Engineering in 2015 for developments in catalysts that have enabled commercial products.

He was a co-founder of Materia, a university spin-off startup to produce catalysts.

Early life and education 
Grubbs was born on February 27, 1942, on a farm in Marshall County, Kentucky, midway between Possum Trot and Calvert City. His parents were Howard and Faye (Atwood) Grubbs. Faye was a schoolteacher. After serving in World War II, the family moved to Paducah, Kentucky, where Howard trained as a diesel mechanic, and Robert attended Paducah Tilghman High School.

At the University of Florida, Grubbs initially intended to study agriculture chemistry. However, he was convinced by professor Merle A. Battiste to switch to organic chemistry. Working with Battiste, he became interested in how chemical reactions occur. He received his B.S. in 1963 and M.S. in 1965 from the University of Florida.

Next, Grubbs attended Columbia University, where he worked with Ronald Breslow on organometallic compounds which contain carbon-metal bonds. Grubbs received his PhD in 1968.

Career 
Grubbs worked with James Collman at Stanford University as a National Institutes of Health fellow during 1968–1969. With Collman, he began to systematically investigate catalytic processes in organometallic chemistry, a then relatively new area of research.

In 1969, Grubbs was appointed to the faculty of Michigan State University, where he began his work on olefin metathesis. Harold Hart, Gerasimos J. Karabatsos, Gene LeGoff, Don Farnum, Bill Reusch and Pete Wagner served as his early mentors at MSU. Grubbs was an assistant professor from 1969 to 1973, and an associate professor from 1973 to 1978. He received a Sloan Fellowship for 1974–1976. In 1975, he went to the Max Planck Institute for Coal Research in Mülheim, Germany on a fellowship from the Alexander von Humboldt Foundation.

In 1978, Grubbs moved to California Institute of Technology as a professor of chemistry. As of 1990 he became the Victor and Elizabeth Atkins Professor of Chemistry.

, Grubbs has an h-index of 160 according to Google Scholar and of 137 according to Scopus.

Commercial activities 
Both first and second generation Grubbs catalysts were commercially available from Materia, a startup company that Grubbs co-founded with Mike Giardello in Pasadena, California, in 1998. Materia has been able to obtain exclusive rights to manufacture many of the known olefin catalysts. Under Giardello, Materia was able to sell their catalysts through Sigma-Aldrichs chemicals catalogue. Sigma-Aldrich became their exclusive worldwide provider. In 2008, Materia partnered with Cargill to form Elevance Renewable Sciences to produce specialty chemicals from renewable oils, including biofuels. In 2017, Materia sold its catalyst business to Umicore. In 2021, Materia was acquired by ExxonMobil. 

Grubbs was a member of the Reliance Innovation Council formed by Reliance Industries Limited, India.

Grubbs was a member of the USA Science and Engineering Festival's Advisory Board.

Research 
Grubbs's main research interests were in organometallic chemistry and synthetic chemistry, particularly the development of novel catalysts for olefin metathesis. In olefin metathesis, a catalyst is used to break the bonds of carbon molecules, which can then re-form to create chemical bonds in new ways, producing new compounds with unique properties. The basic technique can be used for creation of polymers, pharmaceuticals and petrochemicals and has broad applications in areas including pharmaceuticals, biotechnology, agriculture, and plastics.

Grubbs was instrumental in developing a family of ruthenium catalysts, including Grubbs catalyst for olefin metathesis. He studied olefin transformations for ring-closing metathesis (RCM), cross-metathesis reaction (CMR), and ring-opening metathesis polymerization (ROMP) with cyclic olefins such as norbornene. He also contributed to the development of "living polymerization", in which the termination ability of a polymerization reaction is removed. The polymer will continue to replicate until a quenching agent is presented.

The Grubbs group successfully polymerized the 7-oxo norbornene derivative using ruthenium trichloride, osmium trichloride as well as tungsten alkylidenes. They identified a Ru(II) carbene as an effective metal center and in 1992 published the first well-defined, ruthenium-based olefin metathesis catalyst, (PPh3)2Cl2Ru=CHCH=CPh2.

The corresponding tricyclohexylphosphine complex (PCy3)2Cl2Ru=CHCH=CPh2 was also shown to be active. This work culminated in the now commercially available first-generation Grubbs catalyst in 1995. Second generation catalysts were developed as well.

Ruthenium is stable in air and has higher selectivity and lower reactivity than molybdenum, the most promising of the previously discovered catalysts. In addition, Grubbs took a green chemistry approach to catalysis that reduced the potential to create hazardous waste. The Grubbs catalyst has become a standard for general metathesis applications in ordinary laboratories.

By controlling the catalyst used, it became possible to synthesize polymers with specialized structures and functional capabilities, including cyclic olefins, alternating copolymers, and multiblock copolymers. Using catalysts allows chemists to speed up chemical transformations and to lower the cost of what were previously complicated multi-step industrial processes.

Personal life 
While at Columbia University, Grubbs also met his future wife, Helen O'Kane, a special-education teacher, with whom he had three children: Barney (born 1972), Brendan H. (born 1974) and Kathleen (Katy) (born 1977).

Grubbs died from a heart attack at the City of Hope Comprehensive Cancer Center in Duarte, California, on December 19, 2021, at age 79. At the time of his death, he was being treated for lymphoma.

Awards and honors 
Grubbs received the 2005 Nobel Prize in Chemistry, along with Richard R. Schrock and Yves Chauvin, for his work in the field of olefin metathesis. He has received a number of other awards and honors, including the following:

 1989: National Academy of Sciences
 1994: American Academy of Arts and Sciences
 2000: Benjamin Franklin Medal in Chemistry from the Franklin Institute
 2000: ACS Herman F. Mark Polymer Chemistry Award
 2001: ACS Herbert C. Brown Award for Creative Research in Synthetic Methods
 2002: Tolman Medal
 2002: Arthur C. Cope Award
 2003: Tetrahedron Prize for Creativity in Organic Chemistry & BioMedicinal Chemistry (with Dieter Seebach)
 2005: Nobel Prize in Chemistry (with Richard R. Schrock and Yves Chauvin)
 2005: Honorary Fellow of the Royal Society of Chemistry
 2005: Paul Karrer Gold Medal
 2006: Golden Plate Award of the American Academy of Achievement
 2009: Fellow of the American Chemical Society
 2010: American Institute of Chemists Gold Medal
 2015: Inducted into the Florida Inventors Hall of Fame
 2013: National Academy of Inventors
 2015: National Academy of Engineering
 2015: Chinese Academy of Sciences (foreign academician)
 2017: Ira Remsen Award
 2017: Elected a Foreign Member of the Royal Society

Publications

References

External links 
 
 

1942 births
2021 deaths
20th-century American chemists
21st-century American chemists
American Nobel laureates
California Institute of Technology faculty
Columbia University alumni
Members of the United States National Academy of Sciences
Members of the United States National Academy of Engineering
Foreign members of the Chinese Academy of Sciences
Foreign Members of the Royal Society
Fellows of the Royal Society of Chemistry
Michigan State University faculty
Nobel laureates in Chemistry
Paducah Tilghman High School alumni
People from Marshall County, Kentucky
People from Paducah, Kentucky
University of Florida College of Liberal Arts and Sciences alumni